This is a list of moths of China, other than those in the family Sesiidae), which are given in List of moths of China (Sesiidae).

List 

 Abaciscus costimacula
 Abraxas celidota
 Abraxas sinopicaria
 Abraxas suspecta
 Absala
 Acantholipes curvilinea
 Acanthophila angustiptera
 Acanthophila bimaculata
 Acanthophila liui
 Acanthophila nyingchiensis
 Acanthophila obscura
 Acanthophila qinlingensis
 Acerbia khumbeli
 Acerbia kolpakofskii
 Acleris albopterana
 Acleris dispar
 Acleris dryochyta
 Acleris duracina
 Acleris extranea
 Acleris ferox
 Acleris ferrugana
 Acleris flavopterana
 Acleris fuscopterana
 Acleris fuscopunctata
 Acleris gibbopterana
 Acleris griseopterana
 Acleris helvolaris
 Acleris imitatrix
 Acleris kuznetzovi
 Acleris lucipeta
 Acleris lutescentis
 Acleris macropterana
 Acleris maculopterana
 Acleris micropterana
 Acleris nigropterana
 Acleris ochropicta
 Acleris ochropterana
 Acleris porphyrocentra
 Acleris quadridentana
 Acleris recula
 Acleris rosella
 Acleris sinica
 Acleris sinuopterana
 Acleris sinuosaria
 Acleris stachi
 Acleris tabida
 Acleris thiana
 Acleris zeta
 Acria cocophaga
 Acrobasis cantonella
 Acrobasis encaustella
 Acrobasis ferruginella
 Acrobasis frankella
 Acrobasis injunctella
 Acrobasis lienpingialis
 Acrobasis mienshani
 Acrobasis obrutella
 Acrocercops amurensis
 Acronicta metaxantha
 Acronicta nigricans
 Acronicta psichinesis
 Acronicta tiena
 Actias arianeae
 Actias chrisbrechlinae
 Actias dubernardi
 Actias kongjiaria
 Actias uljanae
 Actias winbrechlini
 Adoxophyes beijingensis
 Adoxophyes congruana
 Adoxophyes cyrtosema
 Aemene maculifascia
 Aemene punctatissima
 Aemene punctigera
 Aethes acerba
 Aethes atmospila
 Aethes bistigmatus
 Aethes citreoflava
 Aethes delotypa
 Aethes furvescens
 Aethes hoenei
 Aethes mesomelana
 Aethes rectilineana
 Aethes rubigana
 Aethes semicircularis
 Aethes subcitreoflava
 Agassiziella kwangtungiale
 Aglaops youboialis
 Aglossa micalialis
 Agnibesa pictaria
 Agnibesa plumbeolineata
 Agnibesa punctilinearia
 Agnidra argypha
 Agnidra ataxia
 Agnidra corticata
 Agnidra fulvior
 Agnidra furva
 Agnidra hoenei
 Agnidra tanyospinosa
 Agnidra tigrina
 Agnippe dichotoma
 Agnippe echinulata
 Agnippe miniscula
 Agnippe novisyrictis
 Agnippe yongdengensis
 Agnippe zhouzhiensis
 Agonopterix acutivalvula
 Agonopterix deltopa
 Agonopterix dilatata
 Agonopterix epichersa
 Agonopterix hoenei
 Agonopterix likiangella
 Agonopterix monotona
 Agonopterix orientalis
 Agonopterix rhodogastra
 Agonopterix ventrangulata
 Agonopterix xylinopis
 Agrisius aestivalis
 Agrisius albida
 Agrisius fuliginosus
 Agrisius similis
 Agrisius vernalis
 Agrotera lienpingialis
 Agylla sinensis
 Agylla vittata
 Ahamus altaicola
 Ahamus anomopterus
 Ahamus gangcaensis
 Ahamus jianchuanensis
 Ahamus lijiangensis
 Ahamus luquensis
 Ahamus maquensis
 Ahamus menyuanicus
 Ahamus sichuanus
 Ahamus yulongensis
 Ahamus yunlongensis
 Ahamus yunnanensis
 Ahamus yushuensis
 Ahamus zadoiensis
 Ahamus zhayuensis
 Allotalanta deceptrix
 Aloa collaris
 Alphaea anopunctata
 Alphaea chiyo
 Alphaea dellabrunai
 Alphaea hongfena
 Alphaea khasiana
 Alphaea turatii
 Alucita baihua
 Alucita beinongdai
 Alucita hypocosma
 Alucita longipalpella
 Alucita philomela
 Amata perixanthia
 Amata polymita
 Ambia naumanni
 Ambulyx adhemariusa
 Ambulyx amara
 Ambulyx interplacida
 Ambulyx pseudoregia
 Ambulyx regia
 Ambulyx schauffelbergeri
 Ambulyx zhejiangensis
 Ammatucha brevilepigera
 Ammatucha flavipalpa
 Ammatucha longilepigera
 Ampelophaga nikolae
 Amphicoecia phasmatica
 Amphipyra alpherakii
 Amphitorna brunhyala
 Amphitorna olga
 Amphitorna purpureofascia
 Amsactoides guangxica
 Amurrhyparia
 Anacampsis anisogramma
 Anameristes doryphora
 Anania albeoverbascalis
 Anania chekiangensis
 Anania cuspidata
 Anania delicatalis
 Anania flavidecoralis
 Anania flavimacularis
 Anania fuscobrunnealis
 Anania luteorubralis
 Anania occidentalis
 Anania solaris
 Anania subfumalis
 Anania teneralis
 Anania vicinalis
 Anarsia beitunica
 Anarsia decora
 Anarsia euphorodes
 Anarsia eximia
 Anarsia isogona
 Anarsia largimacularis
 Anarsia magnibimaculata
 Anarsia novitricornis
 Anarsia squamerecta
 Anatrachyntis ptilodelta
 Anatrachyntis yunnanea
 Ancylolomia aduncella
 Ancylolomia carcinella
 Ancylolomia hamatella
 Ancylolomia likiangella
 Ancylolomia longicorniella
 Ancylolomia rotaxella
 Ancylolomia umbonella
 Ancylosis euclastella
 Ancylosis griseomixtella
 Anerosoma
 Antheraea pernyi
 Antheraea roylei
 Antichlidas trigonia
 Antispila kunyuensis
 Anydrelia plicataria
 Aphelia albidula
 Aphelia cinerarialis
 Aphelia disjuncta
 Aphelia flexiloqua
 Aphelia fuscialis
 Aphelia paleana
 Aphomia lolotialis
 Aphomia melli
 Aphomia pygmealis
 Apogurea
 Aprepodoxa mimocharis
 Aproaerema brevihamata
 Aproaerema longihamata
 Archips arcanus
 Archips compitalis
 Archips crassifolianus
 Archips elongatus
 Archips enodis
 Archips eximius
 Archips kellerianus
 Archips limatus
 Archips menotoma
 Archips opiparus
 Archips pachyvalvus
 Archips rudy
 Archips semistructus
 Archips spinatus
 Archips strigopterus
 Archips strojny
 Archips tharsaleopus
 Archischoenobius minumus
 Archischoenobius nanlingensis
 Archischoenobius nigrolepis
 Archischoenobius pallidalis
 Areas galactina
 Argyarctia sericeipennis
 Arichanna sinica
 Aristebulea principis
 Aroga controvalva
 Aroga danfengensis
 Asclerobia sinensis
 Ashibusa aculeata
 Ashibusa clavativalvula
 Ashibusa flavalba
 Ashibusa lativalvula
 Ashibusa sinensis
 Ashibusa subelliptica
 Asiapistosia stigma
 Asiapistosia subnigra
 Asota canaraica
 Asota heliconia
 Assara exiguella
 Assara hoeneella
 Assara incredibilis
 Assara linjiangensis
 Assara tumidula
 Asthena albidaria
 Asthena plenaria
 Asura carnea
 Asura diluta
 Asura griseata
 Asura irregularis
 Asura likiangensis
 Asura megala
 Asura modesta
 Asura nigrivena
 Asura unipuncta
 Asuridoides atuntseica
 Asuridoides osthelderi
 Athrips bidilatata
 Athrips gansuensis
 Athrips huangshana
 Athrips montana
 Athrips neimongolica
 Athrips nigristriata
 Athrips ravida
 Athrips septempunctata
 Athrips tsaidamica
 Athrypsiastis salva
 Athymoris martialis
 Athymoris paramecola
 Athymoris phreatosa
 Aurorobotys aurorina
 Aurorobotys crassispinalis
 Austrapoda beijingensis
 Austrapoda seres
 Autosticha arcivalvaris
 Autosticha bacilliformis
 Autosticha bilobella
 Autosticha chishuiensis
 Autosticha cipingensis
 Autosticha complexivalvula
 Autosticha conjugipunctata
 Autosticha cuspidata
 Autosticha dayuensis
 Autosticha dimochla
 Autosticha fallaciosa
 Autosticha flavida
 Autosticha guangdongensis
 Autosticha guttulata
 Autosticha hainanica
 Autosticha heteromalla
 Autosticha latiuncusa
 Autosticha leukosa
 Autosticha lushanensis
 Autosticha maculosa
 Autosticha menglunica
 Autosticha microphilodema
 Autosticha mirabilis
 Autosticha nanchangensis
 Autosticha oxyacantha
 Autosticha pentagona
 Autosticha rectipunctata
 Autosticha shenae
 Autosticha shexianica
 Autosticha sichunica
 Autosticha sinica
 Autosticha squarrosa
 Autosticha tetragonopa
 Autosticha tianmushana
 Autosticha triangulimaculella
 Autosticha valvidentata
 Autosticha valvifida
 Autosticha wufengensis
 Auzata amaryssa
 Auzata chinensis
 Auzata minuta
 Auzata plana
 Auzata semilucida
 Bellulia hanae
 Betapsestis brevis
 Biston marginata
 Bombyx mori
 Brachmia elaeophanes
 Brachmia monotona
 Brachmia obtrectata
 Brachmia philodema
 Brachmia quassata
 Brachmia tepidata
 Brachodes gressitti
 Brahmaea certhia
 Brahmaea wallichii
 Bryotropha brevivalvata
 Bryotropha elegantula
 Bryotropha montana
 Bryotropha palliptera
 Calamotropha melli
 Caligula anna
 Caligula japonica
 Caligula jonasi
 Caligula lindia
 Calleremites
 Callidrepana jianfenglingensis
 Callindra equitalis
 Callindra principalis
 Calliteara lunulata
 Callopistria nigrescens
 Caloptilia aeolospila
 Caloptilia bimaculata
 Caloptilia dactylifera
 Caloptilia dentata
 Caloptilia garcinicola
 Caloptilia gladiatrix
 Caloptilia hamulifera
 Caloptilia hypodroma
 Caloptilia jasminicola
 Caloptilia koelreutericola
 Caloptilia pekinensis
 Caloptilia quadripunctata
 Caloptilia saccisquamata
 Caloptilia sassafrasicola
 Caloptilia sichuanensis
 Caloptilia soyella
 Caloptilia spinulosa
 Caloptilia striata
 Caloptilia striolata
 Caloptilia tricolor
 Caloptilia trimaculiformis
 Calpenia saundersi
 Camptoloma bella
 Camptoloma kishidai
 Caradjaria
 Catephia albomacula
 Catephia molybdocrosis
 Catephia stygia
 Catocala aestimabilis
 Catocala borthi
 Catocala butleri
 Catocala chenyixini
 Catocala contemnenda
 Catocala davidi
 Catocala dejeani
 Catocala ellamajor
 Catocala florianii
 Catocala gansan
 Catocala haitzi
 Catocala hoenei
 Catocala hoferi
 Catocala hymenoides
 Catocala infasciata
 Catocala invasa
 Catocala jansseni
 Catocala jouga
 Catocala juncta
 Catocala jyoka
 Catocala kaki
 Catocala kasenko
 Catocala kuangtungensis
 Catocala largeteaui
 Catocala lehmanni
 Catocala longipalpis
 Catocala maculata
 Catocala martyrum
 Catocala maso
 Catocala naumanni
 Catocala ohshimai
 Catocala optima
 Catocala seibaldi
 Catocala seiohbo
 Catocala sinyaevi
 Catocala svetlana
 Catocala szechuena
 Catocala thomsoni
 Catocala triphaenoides
 Catocala uljanae
 Catocala xizangensis
 Catoptria mienshani
 Catoptria pandora
 Catoptria persephone
 Catoptria thibetica
 Catoptria xerxes
 Cerura menciana
 Chinese Tussah Moth
 Choristoneura metasequoiacola
 Chrysoteuchia curvicavus
 Chrysoteuchia deltella
 Chrysoteuchia dentatella
 Chrysoteuchia disasterella
 Chrysoteuchia fractellus
 Chrysoteuchia fuliginosellus
 Chrysoteuchia funebrellus
 Chrysoteuchia furva
 Chrysoteuchia hamatella
 Chrysoteuchia hamatoides
 Chrysoteuchia hyalodiscella
 Chrysoteuchia lolotiella
 Chrysoteuchia ningensis
 Chrysoteuchia nonifasciaria
 Chrysoteuchia picturatellus
 Chrysoteuchia quadrapicula
 Chrysoteuchia rotundiprojecta
 Chrysoteuchia shafferi
 Chrysoteuchia yuennanellus
 Cirrhochrista spinuella
 Cochylidia contumescens
 Cochylidia liui
 Cochylimorpha alticolana
 Cochylimorpha amabilis
 Cochylimorpha bipunctata
 Cochylimorpha conankinensis
 Cochylimorpha cuspidata
 Cochylimorpha fuscimacula
 Cochylimorpha isocornutana
 Cochylimorpha jaculana
 Cochylimorpha lungtangensis
 Cochylimorpha maleropa
 Cochylimorpha nankinensis
 Cochylimorpha nipponana
 Cochylimorpha perturbatana
 Cochylimorpha razowskiana
 Cochylimorpha simplicis
 Cochylimorpha yangtseana
 Cochylis posterana
 Cochylis roseana
 Coleophora adspersella
 Coleophora algidella
 Coleophora alticorollina
 Coleophora apicidentata
 Coleophora buteella
 Coleophora capitargentella
 Coleophora caradjai
 Coleophora carchara
 Coleophora cuprea
 Coleophora curvidentatella
 Coleophora dangchuanica
 Coleophora directella
 Coleophora dorsiproducta
 Coleophora estriatella
 Coleophora eucalla
 Coleophora falcipenella
 Coleophora fengxianica
 Coleophora gongliuensis
 Coleophora harbinensis
 Coleophora heihensis
 Coleophora jaculatoria
 Coleophora lativalva
 Coleophora longispina
 Coleophora lucida
 Coleophora melanograpta
 Coleophora montana
 Coleophora neobagorella
 Coleophora neolycii
 Coleophora ningxiana
 Coleophora novisqualorella
 Coleophora nyingchiensis
 Coleophora ochroptera
 Coleophora onobrychiella
 Coleophora orientalis
 Coleophora ossaedeaga
 Coleophora pallidiptera
 Coleophora pandionella
 Coleophora paradoxella
 Coleophora parenthella
 Coleophora parilis
 Coleophora pendulivalvula
 Coleophora plicipunctella
 Coleophora plurispinella
 Coleophora quadrifurca
 Coleophora resupina
 Coleophora sinensis
 Coleophora sittella
 Coleophora summivola
 Coleophora symmicta
 Coleophora varisequens
 Coleophora weymarni
 Coleophora xinjiangensis
 Coleophora yunnanica
 Coleophora yuzhongensis
 Compsoctena pinguis
 Concubina
 Cossus hoenei
 Cossus siniaevi
 Cotachena pubescens
 Crambus achilles
 Crambus bipartellus
 Crambus isshiki
 Crambus magnificus
 Crambus narcissus
 Crambus nigriscriptellus
 Crambus sinicolellus
 Cyclophora mesotoma
 Deltoplastis commatopa
 Deltoplastis lobigera
 Deltoplastis prionaspis
 Diamondback moth
 Dichagyris juldussi
 Dioryctria resiniphila
 Ditrigona aphya
 Ditrigona artema
 Ditrigona berres
 Ditrigona candida
 Ditrigona chama
 Ditrigona chionea
 Ditrigona cirruncata
 Ditrigona inconspicua
 Ditrigona innotata
 Ditrigona lineata
 Ditrigona margarita
 Ditrigona pentesticha
 Ditrigona platytes
 Ditrigona policharia
 Ditrigona polyobotaria
 Ditrigona pomenaria
 Ditrigona sciara
 Ditrigona spilota
 Ditrigona titana
 Doloploca supina
 Drasteria scolopax
 Eboda dissimilis
 Ectomyelois bipectinalis
 Ectomyelois furvivena
 Elophila nigrolinealis
 Elophila nuda
 Elophila radiospinula
 Elophila roesleri
 Elusa inventa
 Endoclita sinensis
 Eois amydroscia
 Epermenia dalianicola
 Epermenia sinica
 Epicephala angustisaccula
 Epicephala domina
 Epicephala impolliniferens
 Epicephala lanceolaria
 Epicrocis oegnusalis
 Epinotia brunnichana
 Epinotia solandriana
 Eschata quadrispinea
 Euchromius nivalis
 Eudocima phalonia
 Eupithecia abrepta
 Eupithecia acerba
 Eupithecia actrix
 Eupithecia admiranda
 Eupithecia adoranda
 Eupithecia aenigma
 Eupithecia albimedia
 Eupithecia amandae
 Eupithecia amicula
 Eupithecia andrasi
 Eupithecia anteacta
 Eupithecia antiqua
 Eupithecia apta
 Eupithecia arenosa
 Eupithecia argentea
 Eupithecia atrisignis
 Eupithecia atuni
 Eupithecia avara
 Eupithecia benigna
 Eupithecia blenna
 Eupithecia boneta
 Eupithecia brevifasciaria
 Eupithecia burselongata
 Eupithecia buysseata
 Eupithecia caduca
 Eupithecia camilla
 Eupithecia certa
 Eupithecia cervina
 Eupithecia chesiata
 Eupithecia chingana
 Eupithecia cichisa
 Eupithecia citraria
 Eupithecia coniurata
 Eupithecia cordata
 Eupithecia coribalteata
 Eupithecia cotidiana
 Eupithecia deformis
 Eupithecia delicata
 Eupithecia depressa
 Eupithecia divina
 Eupithecia duplex
 Eupithecia dura
 Eupithecia egena
 Eupithecia ensifera
 Eupithecia epileptica
 Eupithecia eszterkae
 Eupithecia eurytera
 Eupithecia exacerbata
 Eupithecia eximia
 Eupithecia exquisita
 Eupithecia extrinseca
 Eupithecia fatigata
 Eupithecia fenita
 Eupithecia fervida
 Eupithecia ficta
 Eupithecia finitima
 Eupithecia formosa
 Eupithecia fortis
 Eupithecia fragmentaria
 Eupithecia fulvidorsata
 Eupithecia granata
 Eupithecia hebes
 Eupithecia hesperina
 Eupithecia hoenehermanni
 Eupithecia hoenei
 Eupithecia honesta
 Eupithecia hongxiangae
 Eupithecia horrida
 Eupithecia impolita
 Eupithecia importuna
 Eupithecia incohata
 Eupithecia incorrupta
 Eupithecia indecora
 Eupithecia indissolubilis
 Eupithecia inexhausta
 Eupithecia infecta
 Eupithecia infensa
 Eupithecia infortunata
 Eupithecia inopinata
 Eupithecia insana
 Eupithecia insolita
 Eupithecia intolerabilis
 Eupithecia irreperta
 Eupithecia julia
 Eupithecia konradi
 Eupithecia lamata
 Eupithecia larentimima
 Eupithecia lasciva
 Eupithecia laudabilis
 Eupithecia laudenda
 Eupithecia levata
 Eupithecia likiangi
 Eupithecia lilliputata
 Eupithecia luctuosa
 Eupithecia lunatica
 Eupithecia manifesta
 Eupithecia matrona
 Eupithecia mediocincta
 Eupithecia mentita
 Eupithecia minutula
 Eupithecia missionerata
 Eupithecia molestissima
 Eupithecia molybdaena
 Eupithecia mortua
 Eupithecia nigristriata
 Eupithecia nirvana
 Eupithecia nodosa
 Eupithecia nonferenda
 Eupithecia nonpurgata
 Eupithecia noxia
 Eupithecia omissa
 Eupithecia omniparens
 Eupithecia opicata
 Eupithecia orba
 Eupithecia paupera
 Eupithecia pekingiana
 Eupithecia perendina
 Eupithecia perpetua
 Eupithecia placida
 Eupithecia pollens
 Eupithecia praecipitata
 Eupithecia primitiva
 Eupithecia puella
 Eupithecia qinlingata
 Eupithecia refertissima
 Eupithecia russula
 Eupithecia sacrimontis
 Eupithecia sacrivicae
 Eupithecia sacrosancta
 Eupithecia salubris
 Eupithecia sclerata
 Eupithecia semicalva
 Eupithecia seminuda
 Eupithecia sempiterna
 Eupithecia serpentigena
 Eupithecia severa
 Eupithecia spissata
 Eupithecia stomachosa
 Eupithecia studiosa
 Eupithecia subbrunneata
 Eupithecia subexiguata
 Eupithecia subita
 Eupithecia sublasciva
 Eupithecia subplacida
 Eupithecia svetlanae
 Eupithecia szelenyica
 Eupithecia tamara
 Eupithecia tectaria
 Eupithecia tempestuosa
 Eupithecia tepida
 Eupithecia testacea
 Eupithecia tibetana
 Eupithecia turpis
 Eupithecia ultrix
 Eupithecia vana
 Eupithecia vasta
 Eupithecia verecunda
 Eupithecia verprota
 Eupithecia viata
 Eupithecia villica
 Eupithecia wangi
 Eupithecia yunnani
 Euzophera albipunctella
 Euzophera alpherakyella
 Euzophera atuntsealis
 Euzophera batangensis
 Euzophera cornutella
 Euzophera mienshani
 Evergestis albifasciaria
 Evergestis holophaealis
 Exaeretia bignatha
 Exaeretia concaviuscula
 Exaeretia crassispina
 Exaeretia deltata
 Exaeretia exornata
 Exaeretia liupanshana
 Exaeretia longifolia
 Exaeretia magnignatha
 Exaeretia qinghaiana
 Fascellina chromataria
 Frisilia chinensis
 Ganisa plana
 Gargela albidusa
 Gargela bilineata
 Gargela distigma
 Gargela furca
 Gargela fuscusa
 Gargela hainana
 Gargela hastatela
 Gargela quadrispinula
 Gargela xizangensis
 Gibbovalva clavata
 Gillmeria macrornis
 Glyphipterix amseli
 Glyphipterix chionosoma
 Glyphipterix deliciosa
 Glyphipterix dolichophyes
 Glyphipterix dolichophyses
 Glyphipterix erebanassa
 Glyphipterix macrodrachma
 Glyphipterix octatoma
 Glyphipterix rhinoceropa
 Glyphipterix semiflavana
 Glyphodes pulverulentalis
 Gnorismoneura serrata
 Gnorismoneura zetessima
 Gymnasura semilutea
 Helcystogramma albilepidotum
 Helcystogramma angustum
 Helcystogramma bicuneum
 Helcystogramma brevinodium
 Helcystogramma ceriochrantum
 Helcystogramma flavifuscum
 Helcystogramma flavistictum
 Helcystogramma furvimaculare
 Helcystogramma hassenzanensis
 Helcystogramma imagibicuneum
 Helcystogramma imagitrijunctum
 Helcystogramma rectangulum
 Helcystogramma trijunctum
 Hellinsia gypsotes
 Hellinsia improbus
 Hellinsia ishiyamanus
 Hellinsia kuwayamai
 Hellinsia lacteolus
 Hellinsia logistes
 Hellinsia nigridactylus
 Hellinsia sichuana
 Hemaris fuciformis
 Hepialiscus nepalensis
 Hepialus xiaojinensis
 Herochroma cristata
 Herochroma curvata
 Herochroma mansfieldi
 Herochroma pallensia
 Herochroma perspicillata
 Herochroma rosulata
 Herochroma sinapiaria
 Herochroma supraviridaria
 Herpetogramma pseudomagna
 Herpetogramma rudis
 Hippotion celerio
 Hiroshia nanlingana
 Homaloxestis aciformis
 Homaloxestis eccentropa
 Homaloxestis ellipsoidea
 Homaloxestis hesperis
 Homaloxestis liochlaena
 Homaloxestis mucroraphis
 Hydrelia aggerata
 Hydrelia bella
 Hydrelia castaria
 Hydrelia cingulata
 Hydrelia conspicuaria
 Hydrelia crocearia
 Hydrelia flammulata
 Hydrelia flavilinea
 Hydrelia impleta
 Hydrelia laetivirga
 Hydrelia latsaria
 Hydrelia leucogramma
 Hydrelia luteosparsata
 Hydrelia ochrearia
 Hydrelia parvularia
 Hydrelia pavonica
 Hydrelia rhodoptera
 Hydrelia rubraria
 Hydrelia rufigrisea
 Hydrelia rufinota
 Hydrelia sanguiflua
 Hydrelia sublatsaria
 Hyperoptica ptilocentra
 Hypersypnoides submarginata
 Hypeugoa
 Hyposidra aquilaria
 Hyposidra infixaria
 Imma caelestis
 Imma torophracta
 Isodemis proxima
 Issikiopteryx aurolaxa
 Issikiopteryx corona
 Issikiopteryx fornicata
 Issikiopteryx nigeriflava
 Issikiopteryx obtusanglua
 Issikiopteryx ophrysa
 Issikiopteryx parelongata
 Issikiopteryx rotundiconcava
 Issikiopteryx suiyangensis
 Issikiopteryx trichacera
 Issikiopteryx valvispinata
 Issikiopteryx zonophaera
 Juxtarctia multiguttata
 Kalocyrma decurtata
 Kalocyrma echita
 Katha nankunshanica
 Koedfoltos hackeri
 Krananda lucidaria
 Labdia citracma
 Lacydes spectabilis
 Lamacha
 Lamida obscura
 Lamprosema hoenei
 Lamprosema pectinalis
 Lamprosema tienmushanus
 Lecithocera contorta
 Lecithocera cuspidata
 Lecithocera didentata
 Lecithocera erebosa
 Lecithocera hiata
 Lecithocera lacunara
 Lecithocera licnitha
 Lecithocera meloda
 Lecithocera olinxana
 Lecithocera palmata
 Lecithocera petalana
 Lecithocera sabrata
 Lecithocera tridentata
 Leechia
 Limnaecia compsasis
 Lithosarctia y-albulum
 Lithosia taishanica
 Lithosia yuennanensis
 Lomographa guttalata
 Lomographa lungtanensis
 Lomographa perapicata
 Lophophelma calaurops
 Macrobrochis lucida
 Macrocilix ophrysa
 Macrocilix trinotata
 Macroglossum belis
 Macrothyatira fasciata
 Macrothyatira flavimargo
 Macrothyatira oblonga
 Macrothyatira subaureata
 Macrothyatira transitans
 Martyringa hoenei
 Mesastrape fulguraria
 Mesothyatira
 Metriochroa alboannulata
 Micrarctia
 Miltochrista convexa
 Miltochrista decussata
 Miltochrista delineata
 Miltochrista fasciata
 Miltochrista flexuosa
 Miltochrista inscripta
 Miltochrista sanguinea
 Miltochrista ziczac
 Mimicia
 Mocis ancilla
 Mocis annetta
 Mocis inferna
 Monema meyi
 Monema tanaognatha
 Murzinarctia
 Murzinoria
 Murzinowatsonia
 Mustilia zolotuhini
 Nacoleia immundalis
 Nacoleia perstygialis
 Nacoleia subalbalis
 Nannoarctia tripartita
 Nematopogon chalcophyllis
 Nemophora divina
 Neobarbara
 Nephoploca
 Nordstromia angula
 Nordstromia fusca
 Nordstromia fuscula
 Nordstromia heba
 Nordstromia niva
 Nordstromia unilinea
 Nosophora insignis
 Nosphistica fenestrata
 Nosphistica minutispina
 Nosphistica orientana
 Nosphistica parameocola
 Obeidia gigantearia
 Oberthueria jiatongae
 Oberthueria yandu
 Oidaematophorus iwatensis
 Oreta bilineata
 Ornativalva plutelliformis
 Pachista
 Pachista superans
 Pachyodes amplificata
 Pachyodes jianfengensis
 Pachyodes leucomelanaria
 Pachyodes novata
 Pachyodes ornataria
 Pachyodes subtritus
 Palpita curvispina
 Palpita inusitata
 Palpita minuscula
 Palpita parvifraterna
 Paracymoriza truncata
 Parafuscoptilia
 Parahepialus
 Paralbara achlyscarleta
 Paralbara pallidinota
 Paralbara spicula
 Parapsestis dabashana
 Parapsestis implicata
 Parapsestis meleagris
 Parapsestis wernyaminta
 Parasa minwangi
 Parasa undulata
 Paraspilarctia klapperichi
 Paratorna pterofulva
 Paratorna pteropolia
 Patania expictalis
 Patania iopasalis
 Pediasia batangensis
 Pediasia dolicanthia
 Pediasia echinulatia
 Pediasia jecondica
 Pediasia perselloides
 Pediasia yangtseella
 Phalera flavescens
 Phragmataecia innotata
 Phrealcia steueri
 Platyptilia isodactylus
 Problepsis conjunctiva
 Problepsis eucircota
 Problepsis paredra
 Problepsis phoebearia
 Problepsis subreferta
 Pseudalbara fuscifascia
 Pseudalbara parvula
 Pseudanabasis
 Pseudiragoides florianii
 Pseudiragoides itsova
 Pseudocroesia
 Pseudostegania distinctaria
 Pseudostegania lijiangensis
 Pseudostegania qinlingensis
 Pseudostegania straminearia
 Pseudostegania yargongaria
 Pseudostegania zhoui
 Psidopala apicalis
 Psidopala ornata
 Psidopala paeoniola
 Psidopala roseola
 Psidopala undulans
 Psidopala warreni
 Pterophorus elaeopus
 Pycnarmon chinensis
 Pycnarmon geminipuncta
 Pycnarmon radiata
 Pyrausta bieti
 Pyrausta contigualis
 Pyrausta contristalis
 Pyrausta curvalis
 Pyrausta draesekei
 Pyrausta ecteinalis
 Pyrausta genialis
 Pyrausta griseocilialis
 Pyrausta hampsoni
 Pyrausta leechi
 Pyrausta mandarinalis
 Pyrausta moupinalis
 Pyrausta mystica
 Pyrausta oberthuri
 Pyrausta obscurior
 Pyrausta obstipalis
 Pyrausta odontogrammalis
 Pyrausta persimilis
 Pyrausta postalbalis
 Pyrausta punctilinealis
 Pyrausta pygmealis
 Pyrausta quadrimaculalis
 Pyrausta rectifascialis
 Pyrausta rueckbeili
 Pyrausta rufalis
 Pyrausta splendida
 Pyrausta strigatalis
 Pyrausta subfuscalis
 Pyrausta sumptuosalis
 Pyrausta syfanialis
 Pyrausta szetschwanalis
 Pyrausta tapaishanensis
 Pyrausta thibetalis
 Pyrausta tortualis
 Pyrausta tschelialis
 Pyrausta zeitunalis
 Rhagoba obvellata
 Rivula curvifera
 Rondotia diaphana
 Sabra taibaishanensis
 Schistomitra joelmineti
 Sciota obscurella
 Scirpophaga adunctella
 Scirpophaga auristrigellus
 Scirpophaga gotoi
 Scirpophaga humilis
 Scirpophaga khasis
 Scirpophaga linguatella
 Scirpophaga parvalis
 Scirpophaga whalleyi
 Scopula ambigua
 Scopula anfractata
 Scopula asthena
 Scopula bifalsaria
 Scopula bimacularia
 Scopula delitata
 Scopula dubernardi
 Scopula emma
 Scopula farinaria
 Scopula fibulata
 Scopula francki
 Scopula hesycha
 Scopula klaphecki
 Scopula lutearia
 Scopula manes
 Scopula manifesta
 Scopula marcidaria
 Scopula mendicaria
 Scopula modicaria
 Scopula oxysticha
 Scopula parallelaria
 Scopula polyterpes
 Scopula proximaria
 Scopula pseudocorrivalaria
 Scopula rivularia
 Scopula rufigrisea
 Scopula sedataria
 Scopula sinopersonata
 Scopula sjostedti
 Scopula subpulchellata
 Scopula szechuanensis
 Scopula tsekuensis
 Scopula yihe
 Scythropiodes tribula
 Semiothisa cinerearia
 Silk worm
 Silk worm cocoon demineralizing
 Spatalistis aglaoxantha
 Spatulignatha arcuata
 Spatulignatha chrysopteryx
 Spatulignatha longizonalis
 Spilarctia nydia
 Spilarctia zhangmuna
 Spilosoma erythrozona
 Spilosoma lubricipeda
 Stegasta variana
 Stenopsestis bruna
 Stenoptilia poculi
 Stigmatophora acerba
 Stigmatophora chekiangensis
 Stigmatophora confusa
 Stigmatophora conjuncta
 Stigmatophora grisea
 Stigmatophora hainanensis
 Stigmatophora likiangensis
 Stigmatophora obraztsovi
 Stigmatophora rubivena
 Stigmella circumargentea
 Stigmella fervida
 Stigmella kao
 Stigmella lithocarpella
 Stigmella vandrieli
 Streltzovia
 Syllepte amoyalis
 Syllepte capnosalis
 Syllepte fuscoinvalidalis
 Syllepte fuscomarginalis
 Syllepte hoenei
 Syllepte invalidalis
 Syllepte lucidalis
 Syllepte mandarinalis
 Syllepte ningpoalis
 Syllepte pallidinotalis
 Syllepte proctizonalis
 Syllepte rhyparialis
 Synersaga breviclavata
 Synersaga brevidigitata
 Talis cornutella
 Talis erenhotica
 Talis qinghaiella
 Teliphasa erythrina
 Teliphasa hamata
 Teliphasa similalbifusa
 Thitarodes baimaensis
 Thitarodes bibelteus
 Thitarodes biruensis
 Thitarodes deqinensis
 Thitarodes latitegumenus
 Thitarodes pui
 Thymistadopsis undulifera
 Torodora galera
 Torodora manoconta
 Tortrix sinapina
 Trichophysetis aurantidiscalis
 Trichophysetis bipunctalis
 Trichophysetis hampsoni
 Tridrepana bifurcata
 Tridrepana hainana
 Trifurcula sinica
 Udea albostriata
 Udea curvata
 Udea prunalis
 Ugia insuspecta
 Vellonifer doncasteri
 Vladimirea krasilnikovae
 Watsonarctia
 Wernya cyrtoma
 Wernya hamigigantea
 Wernya lineofracta
 Wernya sechuana
 Xestia caelebs
 Ypsolopha atrobrunnella
 Ypsolopha costibasella
 Ypsolopha diana
 Ypsolopha helva
 Ypsolopha lutisplendida
 Ypsolopha melanocnista
 Ypsolopha mienshani
 Ypsolopha parodaula
 Ypsolopha rhytidota
 Ypsolopha sordida
 Ypsolopha yangi
 Yucilix
 Zebronia ornatalis

References

Moths
Moths
China
China
China